Xinghua Subdistrict is a subdistrict and the seat of Zhalantun, Inner Mongolia, China. , it has five residential communities (居委会) under its administration.

See also
List of township-level divisions of Inner Mongolia

References

Township-level divisions of Inner Mongolia